The 1908 United States presidential election in Maryland took place on November 3, 1908. All contemporary 46 states were part of the 1908 United States presidential election. State voters chose eight electors to the Electoral College, which selected the president and vice president.

After having trended heavily Republican during Bryan's previous two elections in 1896 and 1900, Maryland would become exceedingly close in 1904 with Alton B. Parker taking 7 of 8 electoral votes despite the highest Theodore Roosevelt elector beating any of Parker's by 51 votes. Large-scale immigration and efforts to reduce the solidly Republican Black vote were opposed for this election by dislike of Bryan's populism in this urbanizing state. At first, the latter trend appeared to be strong, and by the middle of September Taft's campaign managers thought Maryland was safe in his pocket, although Bryan had campaigned in the state a few days previously. This trend continued into early October as Roosevelt's war on Samuel Gompers was believed a major aid to Taft. However, a new poll in the second week of October suggested the state could go to Bryan by 15,000 votes. By election day, it was clear that Maryland would be almost as close as the 1904 election had proved.

Maryland was won by the Democratic nominees, former Representative William Jennings Bryan of Nebraska and his running mate John W. Kern of Indiana, although the highest elector for Republican candidates William Howard Taft and James S. Sherman gained 605 more votes than the highest Bryan elector. This difference was supposedly due to the “Wilson Law” designed to make it easier for Democrats to cast ballots for both Presidential electors and Congress by a simple turning down of a single fold in the ballot paper.

In this election, Maryland voted 8.28% more Democratic than the nation at-large.

Results

Results by county

Counties that flipped from Democratic to Republican
Baltimore (City)
Dorchester
Prince George's
St. Mary's

See also
 United States presidential elections in Maryland
 1908 United States presidential election
 1908 United States elections

Notes

References 

Maryland
1908
Presidential